Choose between Arts and Entertainment below:

The arts
Entertainment